The 1959 DDR-Oberliga was the eleventh season of the DDR-Oberliga, the first tier of league football in East Germany. Rather than in the traditional autumn-spring format the Oberliga played for six seasons from 1955 to 1960 in the calendar year format, modelled on the system used in the Soviet Union. From 1961–62 onwards the league returned to its traditional format.

The league was contested by fourteen teams. SC Wismut Karl-Marx-Stadt, incidentally based at Aue and not Karl-Marx-Stadt, won the championship, the club's last of three national East German championships. On the strength of the 1959 title Wismut qualified for the 1960–61 European Cup where the club was knocked out by SK Rapid Wien in the first round. League runners-up ASK Vorwärts Berlin qualified for the 1960–61 European Cup Winners' Cup instead of FDGB-Pokal winner SC Dynamo Berlin and was knocked out by Rudá Hvězda Brno in the preliminary round.

Bernd Bauchspieß of Chemie Zeitz was the league's top scorer with 18 goals.

Table									
The 1959 season saw two newly promoted clubs, BSG Lokomotive Stendal and Chemie Zeitz.

Results

References

Sources

External links
 Das Deutsche Fussball Archiv  Historic German league tables

1959 domestic association football leagues
1959
Ober
Ober
Ober